George Carter (4 August 1846 – date of death unknown) was an English cricketer active in the 1860s and 1870s, making twelve appearances in first-class cricket. Born at Warblington, Hampshire, Carter was a right-handed batsman who bowled right-arm roundarm fast, who played for Hampshire.

Career
Carter made his first-class debut for Hampshire against the Marylebone Cricket Club (MCC) at Lord's in 1869, playing a further first-class match in that season in the return match between the sides at Day's Ground, Southampton. The following season he appeared in two first-class matches for the county, both against Lancashire at Old Trafford and Day's Ground. Carter next appeared in first-class cricket for Hampshire in 1876 against Derbyshire at Day's Ground, before playing in three first-class matches in the following season against the MCC, Derbyshire, and Kent. In 1878, Carter played in three final first-class matches against the same opposition from the previous season. In twelve appearances in first-class cricket, Carter scored 274 runs, averaging 11.91, with a high score of 34.

Carter's date of death is unknown.

References

External links
George Carter at ESPNcricinfo
George Carter at CricketArchive

1846 births
Year of death unknown
People from Warblington
English cricketers
English cricketers of 1864 to 1889
Hampshire cricketers